Jenni Byrne is a political advisor, political commenter, and government relations expert. A member of the Conservative Party of Canada and the Progressive Conservative Party of Ontario, she is a former advisor to Prime Minister Stephen Harper and former Principal Secretary to Doug Ford. Once referred to as "the most powerful woman in Ottawa," she currently operates her own consulting firm, Jenni Byrne + Associates.

Personal life

Family
Byrne was born to Jerry and Julie Byrne in 1976 in Fenelon Falls, Ontario. Her mother was a teacher, who died in 2010 at the age of 58. Her father is a carpenter who joined the Reform Party in the 1990s to protest the long-gun registry enacted as part of the Firearms Act, 1995, introduced by the Liberal government of Prime Minister Jean Chrétien. Her sister, Jerra Kosick (nee Byrne), is also involved with the Conservative Party of Canada, most recently serving as the chief of staff to Minister Michelle Rempel.

Byrne is not married and does not have children. She was previously involved in a romantic relationship with Conservative MP Pierre Poilievre, whose campaign for leader of the Conservative Party of Canada she helped to direct.

Education
Byrne was a nursing student at  Georgian College, but did not graduate. She later attended the University of Ottawa, where she organized campus clubs for the Reform Party of Canada and did not graduate.

Political career
Byrne became involved in politics at age 16, when she joined the Reform Party. Byrne's father, Jerry, had joined the same party to protest the Liberals' long-gun registry. She eventually became the President of the student Reform Party Club at the University of Ottawa. In a media interview, Byrne cited her concerns over debt reduction and tax cuts and how they were more important to her generation than to her parents' generation: "It's great for them to say don’t cut here or there, but they won't be the ones affected by (the debt). They’re in their late 40s and they will probably still benefit from government programs. But Canada looks like a bleak place for me by the time I'm their age."

Byrne has been called Prime Minister Harper's "single best political organizer", a dedicated Harper loyalist who believed in the party during its darkest days.  She is also known for her tenacity and possesses "a single-minded unwillingness to put up with people screwing around."

Conservative Party 
In 2009, she became the Director of Political Operations for the Conservative Party of Canada following the appointment of Doug Finley to the Senate of Canada.

Byrne was the deputy national campaign manager in the 2006, 2008, and 2011 federal elections, serving under Doug Finley.  Between elections, Byrne served in several roles in the Prime Minister's Office, including advisor to Chief of Staff Ian Brodie and Director of Issues Management, and at the headquarters of the Conservative Party of Canada.

In the 2011 campaign she was promoted to national campaign manager due to the ill health of Doug Finley.  She served as campaign manager of the machine designed and largely still run by Finley, taking the pressure off him to allow his pursuit of cancer treatment. Byrne's responsibilities were overseeing the day-to-day operations of Finley’s campaign, what The Hill Times called "one [of] the most efficient, richest, and iron-disciplined campaign machines in Canadian political history."

Return to Prime Minister's Office
In August 2013, Byrne left her job as the Conservative Director of Political Operations and returned to the Prime Minister's Office as co-Deputy Chief of Staff.

Campaign manager for 2015 election
In October 2014 the Conservative Party announced that Byrne would lead the campaign in the 42nd Canadian federal election.  Shortly before the election, Byrne was reported to have left the Conservative Party's campaign office in Ottawa and returned to Calgary. The Conservative government lost power to the Liberals, who won a majority of the seats. After the election, a number of Conservatives blamed Byrne for her role in the party's defeat and criticized her management style. Byrne's contract expired after the election.

Ontario provincial politics

Following Doug Ford's election as leader of the Ontario PC Party in March 2018, Byrne took over as Director of Field Operations for the 2018 Provincial Election. After the election, Byrne was selected to be Ford's first Principal Secretary. 
In January 2019 she left the Premier’s office to accept an appointment to the Ontario energy board. In February 2020 she launched Jenni Byrne + Associates, a government relations firm based in Toronto.

Media
Byrne is a frequent political commentator on Canadian television networks, most frequently featured on CBC’s Power and Politics with Vassy Kapelos.
She is a regular member of David Herle’s podcast, The Herle Burly.

References

External links

Office of the Prime Minister (Canada)
Canadian campaign managers
Living people
University of Ottawa alumni
1977 births